Major-General Sir Evelyn Dalrymple Fanshawe, CB, CBE (25 May 1895 – 14 March 1979) was a British Army officer and the Director of the International Refugee Organisation in the British Zone of Germany from 1948 to 1952.

A grandson on his mother's side of Sir Evelyn Wood, he was born to Lt. Gen. Sir Hew Dalrymple Fanshawe and Anna Paulina Mary Wood in British India in 1895. He married Marie Harari in 1920, daughter of Sir Victor Harari.

Military career
After being educated at The King's School, Canterbury and attending the Royal Military College, Sandhurst, Fanshawe was commissioned into the Queen's Bays in 1914 and saw service in France, Palestine, Mesopotamia, Persia, Russia and Syria during World War I; among his assignments during this period was Aide-de-camp to his father who was General Officer Commanding the British Cavalry Corps (1915). From 1915 to 1919 he was seconded to the Royal Flying Corps.

He returned to his regiment as Adjutant in 1919. In 1939 he was appointed Commander of the 20th Armoured Brigade and following promotion to Major General he held the post of the Armoured Training and Commander of the Royal Armoured Corps Training Establishment from 1942 to the end of the War.

Later career
Fanshawe retired from the Army in 1945 whereupon he became the UN Relief and Rehabilitation Administration Director in the British Zone of Germany (1945–1948). Subsequently, he was Director of the International Refugee Organisation in the British Zone of Germany from 1948 to 1952. In 1952 he was attached to the Dominion Countries UN Organisation Mission, and in 1960 was High Sheriff of Northamptonshire. He lived at Guilsborough House near Northampton.

References

Bibliography

External links
Generals of World War II

1895 births
1979 deaths
British Army major generals
Companions of the Order of the Bath
Commanders of the Order of the British Empire
Knights Bachelor
British Army personnel of World War I
British Army generals of World War II
2nd Dragoon Guards (Queen's Bays) officers
High Sheriffs of Northamptonshire
Roehampton Trophy
Military personnel of British India
People educated at The King's School, Canterbury
Graduates of the Royal Military College, Sandhurst
Royal Flying Corps officers
Royal Air Force officers
Royal Air Force personnel of World War I
British people in colonial India
British expatriates in Germany